Electropop is a hybrid music genre combining elements of electronic and pop genres. Writer Hollin Jones has described it as a variant of synth-pop with outstanding heavy emphasis on its electronic sound. The genre was developed in the 1980s and saw a revival of popularity and influence in the late 2000s.

History

Early 1980s

During the early 1980s, British artists such as Gary Numan, the Human League, Soft Cell, John Foxx and Visage helped pioneer a new synth-pop style that drew more heavily from electronic music and emphasized primary usage of synthesizers.

21st century

Britney Spears' influential fifth studio album Blackout (2007) incorporated elements of the genre, catapulting electropop to mainstream significance. The media in 2009 ran articles proclaiming a new era of different electropop stars, and indeed the times saw a rise in popularity of several electropop artists. In the Sound of 2009 poll of 130 music experts conducted for the BBC, ten of the top fifteen artists named were of the electropop genre. Lady Gaga had major commercial success from 2008 with her debut album The Fame. Music writer Simon Reynolds noted that "Everything about Gaga came from electroclash, except the music, which wasn't particularly 1980s". The Korean pop music scene has also become dominated and influenced by electropop, particularly with boy bands and girl groups such as Super Junior, SHINee, f(x) and Girls' Generation.

Singer Michael Angelakos of Passion Pit said in a 2009 interview that while playing electropop was not his intention, the limitations of dorm life made the genre more accessible.

In 2009, The Guardian quoted James Oldham—head of artists and repertoire at A&M Records—as saying "All A&R departments have been saying to managers and lawyers: 'Don't give us any more bands because we're not going to sign them and they're not going to sell records.' So everything we've been put on to is electronic in nature."

In 2019, Kenneth Womack wrote that singer and songwriter Billie Eilish had "staked her claim as the reigning queen of electropop" with her critical and commercial hit album When We All Fall Asleep, Where Do We Go?.

See also
Dance-pop
Minimal wave
Vaporwave
Futurepop
Auto-Tune

References 

Bibliography
 
 

 
1980s in music
1990s in music
2000s in music
2010s in music
2010s fads and trends
Electronic music genres
Pop music genres
British styles of music